MT81 is a mycotoxin with antibiotic activity.

References

Dihydroxyanthraquinones
Mycotoxins
Furopyrans